Mlázovice is a market town in Jičín District in the Hradec Králové Region of the Czech Republic. It has about 500 inhabitants.

Administrative parts
The village of Mezihoří is an administrative part of Mlázovice.

Notable people
Jan Křtitel Kuchař (1751–1829), musician and composer; lived here in childhood

References

Populated places in Jičín District
Market towns in the Czech Republic